A Mortician's Tale is a management video game developed by Laundry Bear Games. Players take control of a mortician working in a funeral home. The game was released for Windows and macOS in October 2017.

Gameplay
A Mortician's Tale is a management video game in which the player takes control of Charlie, who has just started work as a mortician at a funeral home.

Development and release
A Mortician's Tale was developed by Canadian indie game studio Laundry Bear Games. Inspiration for the game came from author and mortician Caitlin Doughty and death acceptance organisation The Order of the Good Death.

The game was released for Windows and macOS on 18 October 2017.

Reception

A Mortician's Tale was received positively by critics. Polygon ranked it 50th on their list of the 50 best games of 2017. The game was nominated for "Game, Special Class" at the National Academy of Video Game Trade Reviewers Awards, and for the Nuovo Award at the Independent Games Festival Competition Awards.

References

External links
 

2017 video games
IOS games
MacOS games
Video games developed in Canada
Windows games
Video games about death